Mayo Fuster Morell (born 1975) is a social researcher. Her research has focused on sharing economy, social movements, online communities and digital Commons, frequently using participatory action research and method triangulation. She has been part of the most important research centres studying Internet and its social effects, including the Berkman Center for Internet and Society, the MIT Center for Civic Media or the Berkeley School of Information. As an active citizen, she is the co-founder of multiple initiatives around digital Commons and Free Culture, such as the Procomuns Forum on collaborative economy.

Education
Her inter-disciplinary background is grounded in a wide range of academic studies. She has degrees on Economics (University of Valencia) and Anthropology (Universitat Rovira i Virgili), several post-graduate studies (University of London, Universitat Rovira i Virgili), a MPhil in NGO management (Universidad Complutense de Madrid), and MPhil and PhD in Social and Political Science (European University Institute, Florence).

Her PhD thesis, supervised by Donatella della Porta, performed the first large quantitative study on Commons-based peer production communities, providing insights on their governance and infrastructure provision. She combined a large N statistical analysis and case study comparisons (World Social Forum, Flickr, wikiHow and Wikipedia).

Career
During her PhD, in 2008, she was visiting researcher at the School of Information, University of California Berkeley (sponsored by Howard Rheingold and Coye Cheshire) and provided teaching assistance at the Communication Department – Stanford University. In 2010, she was postdoctoral researcher at the Institute of Government and Public Policies (Autonomous University of Barcelona) and visiting scholar at the Internet Interdisciplinary Institute (Open University of Catalonia).

In 2011, she became a fellow of the Berkman Center for Internet and Society (Harvard University), and during two years she researched there in the dimension, evolution, and governance of Commons-based peer production under the supervision of Yochai Benkler. In 2012, she was visiting scholar at the MIT Center for Civic Media.

In 2013 she earned the Juan de la Cierva Spanish postdoctoral scholarship, coming back to the Institute of Government and Public Policies where she founded the IGOPnet research group. In 2014 she won the prestigious 5-year scholarship Ramón y Cajal. Since 2016, she is director of the research group on digital commons Dimmons in the IN3 at Open University of Catalonia. In 2017 (and since 2013) she is Faculty Associate at the Berkman Klein Center.

Activist and social engagement

She started her activist engagement in the Anti-globalization movement, participating in the 2000 protests in Prague, engaging with the Catalonia's Movement de Resistencia Global (MRG) and Peoples' Global Action networks, and later actively participating in the series of World Social Forums and European Social Forums. More recently, she joined the 15-M Movement and Occupy Wall Street.

In 2004, with Jeff Juris and Enric Duran, she co-funded "Glocal, Centre de Recerca" (Glocal, Research Center), an association dedicated to social research and skill creation for activism. Under this frame, she co-created the cooperative space "Infoespai" (or Infospace) and Guia util per la transformació social (Useful Guide for the Social Transformation in Catalonia), both considered precedents of Enric Duran's subsequent popular projects.

Between 2006 and 2009 she co-promoted Networked Politics, a series of international creative seminars remixing people from different generations and political histories as a contribution to the debates and practical experiments concerning new forms of political organisation.

She has been co-founder of multiple initiatives around digital commons, such as the IGOPnet research group, the Free Culture Forum (2009 & 2010), the International Commons Conference 2010, the Escuela de los Commons in Barcelona, the Digital Commons Global Forum, while participating or being invited to many others. In 2011, she appeared in the Wikipedia donation banners. She collaborates with Spanish left-wing newspaper Eldiario.es.
She is the promoter of Procomuns Forum on collaborative economy.

Work
Mayo Fuster Morell is the lead researcher of Dimmons Research Group of the Internet Interdisciplinary Institute of the Open University of Catalonia (UOC), and the director of the Barcelona UOC Chair in digital economy: for a sharing economy focused on people’s welfare and the Right to the City gathering the UOC, the Barcelona City Council and Barcelona Activa. 

She is the UOC’s lead researcher of the National program project "Gender Digital project on gender equality in the digital sphere", and the European H2020 projects: PLUS: Platform Labor in Urban Spaces and DECODE: Building the next generation of cooperative data platforms for digital sovereignty, and P2Pvalue: Techno-social platform for sustainable models and value generation in commons-based peer production. Furthermore, Dimmons Research Group promotes feminist digitalization of social economy though Matchimpulsa.barcelona, an enterprises promotion program of 130 companies in Barcelona.

She has published more than 70 papers in the topics of social movements, online communities, commons-based peer production, Internet and politics, and public policies. Her works on governance of commons-based peer production are considered pioneering in the field. 
Her research on Wikipedia and on its governance is considered a reference on the field by media, and academics.
and her works comparing the grassroots movements with the digital Commons have attracted international interest. She has contributed to major pieces of work concerning Open Data and Cultural Commons. She is Principal Investigator in the P2Pvalue European Project, where she has led the creation of the Directory of Commons-based peer production initiatives, a unique contribution to the field.

Scientific and social recognitions
 Advisory board of the Open Media Cluster (Italy)
 Affiliate member of The Network of Excellence in Internet Science.
 Board member of the Open Knowledge Foundation – Spanish Chapter.
 Editorial board of the Journal of Peer Production
 Member of the Research Committee of the Wikimedia Foundation
 Member of the steering committee of the Internet and Politics Standing group of the European Consortium of Political Science

Selected works

See also
 15-M Movement
 Commons-based peer production
 Digital Commons
 Free culture movement

References

External links
 Mayo Fuster at Berkman Center
 Mayo Fuster's account at Accademia.edu
 Mayo Fuster's Web

1975 births
Autonomous University of Barcelona alumni
Berkman Fellows
Academics from Catalonia
Activists from Catalonia
Scientists from Catalonia
Social scientists from Catalonia
Free culture movement
Living people
University of Valencia alumni